Emilio Fontanella (12 July 1881 – ?) was an Italian rower. He competed at the 1906 Intercalated Games in Athens. He won gold medals in three events: Coxed pairs (1000 m), Coxed pairs (1 mile), and coxed four.

References

1881 births
Year of death missing
Italian male rowers
Olympic rowers of Italy
Rowers at the 1906 Intercalated Games
European Rowing Championships medalists